Arachthos is a former municipality in the Arta regional unit, Epirus, Greece. Since the 2011 local government reform it is part of the municipality Nikolaos Skoufas, of which it is a municipal unit. The municipal unit has an area of 73.431 km2. It is situated along the lower course of the river Arachthos, south of Arta. 
Population 4,661 (2011). The seat of the municipality was in Neochori.

Near Arachthos, there is the static inverter plant of HVDC Italy-Greece.

References

Populated places in Arta (regional unit)